Bhaskarrao Vithojirao Jadhav (17 June 1867 – 26 June 1950) was an Indian politician, social reformer, and leader of the Satyashodhak Samaj, Non-Brahmin movement and the co-operative movement.

Bhaskarrao Jadhav started his career as an administrator in the Kolhapur princely state in 1895. He worked as the Superintendent or administrator of Kolhapur municipality from 1904 to 1918.

Jadhav was nominated to the Bombay Legislative Council in 1922 and subsequently elected to the Council twice from Satara constituency in 1923 and 1926. Under the system of diarchy in Bombay Presidency, he served as a Minister of Education from 1923 to 1927 and Minister of Forest, Excise & Agriculture from 1928 to 1930. In 1930, he was elected to the Central Legislative Assembly. He represented the Justice Party at the Round Table Conference.

Bhaskarrao Jadhav was also a scholar of Indian history and philosophy. He wrote scholarly articles on various topics like criticism of Ramayana, origin of the Marathas and their language, development of the Vedas, evolution of the deity Mahadeva etc.

References

Bombay Presidency
Members of the Bombay Legislative Council
People from Kolhapur
Marathi-language writers
Marathi politicians
Marathi people
1867 births
1950 deaths